Hardial Singh Kamboj is an Indian politician and a member of Indian National Congress. In the 2017 Punjab Legislative Assembly election, he was elected for 2nd time as the member of the Punjab Legislative Assembly from Rajpura Assembly constituency.

Constituency
Singh Kamboj represented the Rajpura. He won the seat as a candidate of the Indian National Congress, beating the incumbent member of the Punjab Legislative Assembly Ashutosh Joshi of the Aam Aadmi Party by 32565 votes.

References

Living people
Punjab, India MLAs 2017–2022
Indian National Congress politicians
People from Punjab, India
Indian National Congress politicians from Punjab, India
1958 births